Kim Kyong-Hun (born July 15, 1975) is a South Korean taekwondo practitioner and Olympic champion. He competed at the 2000 Summer Olympics in Sydney, where he won the gold medal in the heavyweight competition.

References

External links
 
 

1975 births
Living people
South Korean male taekwondo practitioners
Olympic taekwondo practitioners of South Korea
Taekwondo practitioners at the 2000 Summer Olympics
Olympic gold medalists for South Korea
Asian Games medalists in taekwondo
Olympic medalists in taekwondo
Taekwondo practitioners at the 2002 Asian Games
Medalists at the 2000 Summer Olympics
Asian Games gold medalists for South Korea
Medalists at the 2002 Asian Games
World Taekwondo Championships medalists
Asian Taekwondo Championships medalists
21st-century South Korean people